Afon Wen is a small hamlet on the Llŷn peninsula in the Welsh principal area of Gwynedd.

Location 
It is located at the mouth of the Afon Wen river, half a mile from the village of Chwilog and midway between Pwllheli and Cricieth.

History & Amenities 
Afon Wen railway station was formerly a junction station on the Cambrian Coast Line, from where a connection could be made via the Carnarvonshire Railway (later LNWR and LMS) to the north coast at Caernarfon.  For many people the name of the place is synonymous with that line, as in the song Trên i Afon Wen by Welsh pop star Bryn Fôn. The line was closed in 1965, and the track lifted.  Part of the line, from Caernarfon to Dinas, is now part of the route of the newly re-opened Welsh Highland Railway.

The section from Caernarfon to Bryncir has been converted into a footpath/cycleway that forms part of the National Cycle Network Route 8 (NCN8) and is known as Lôn Eifion.

See also
Caernarvon railway station

External links 

www.geograph.co.uk : photos of Afon Wen and surrounding area

Villages in Gwynedd
Llanystumdwy